Sporoxeia is a genus of flowering plants belonging to the family Melastomataceae.

Its native range is Southern Central China to Indo-China.

Species:

Sporoxeia blastifolia 
Sporoxeia clavicalcarata 
Sporoxeia imparifolia 
Sporoxeia ochthocharioides 
Sporoxeia petelotii 
Sporoxeia rosea 
Sporoxeia sciadophila

References

Melastomataceae
Melastomataceae genera